Camairago is a frazione of Castelgerundo in the Province of Lodi in the Italian region Lombardy, located about  southeast of Milan and about  southeast of Lodi.

From 1 January 2018 the comune was unified with Cavacurta and the new municipality took the name of Castelgerundo.

References

Cities and towns in Lombardy